Teatro Miguel Falabella is a theatre in Rio de Janeiro, Brazil.
It was inaugurated on 21 August 1997.

References

Theatres in Rio de Janeiro (city)
1997 establishments in Brazil